Richard Cahill was an English professional footballer. An outside right, he played in the Football League for just one club, Blackpool. He played 21 League games for the club during the 1911–12 campaign.

References

Year of birth missing
Year of death missing
Footballers from Newcastle upon Tyne
English footballers
Blackpool F.C. players
Association football outside forwards